John M. Braisted, Jr. (March 13, 1907 – December 9, 1997) was an American lawyer and politician from New York.

Life
He was born on March 13, 1907, in Port Richmond, Staten Island, New York City. In 1931, he married Helen Pettigrew (died 1987), and they had two sons. He practiced law in New York City and entered politics as a Democrat.

He was a member of the New York State Senate (17th D.) from 1948 to 1952, sitting in the 166th, 167th and 168th New York State Legislatures. In November 1952, he ran for re-election, but was defeated by Republican John G. MacDonald.

He was District Attorney of Richmond County from 1956 to 1975. As such, he was a party in De Veau v. Braisted, a 1960 U.S. Supreme Court case.

He died on December 9, 1997, at the home of his son James in West Brighton, Staten Island.

References

1907 births
1997 deaths
Democratic Party New York (state) state senators
Richmond County District Attorneys
20th-century American lawyers
20th-century American politicians
Politicians from Staten Island